Harley Jane Kozak (born January 28, 1957) is an American actress and author. She made her film debut in the slasher film The House on Sorority Row (1982), and had a recurring role as Mary Duvall on the soap opera Santa Barbara between 1985 and 1989. She later had supporting parts in Clean and Sober (1988) and When Harry Met Sally... (1989), before starring in the major studio films Parenthood (1989) and Arachnophobia (1990).

Kozak continued to act in film throughout the remainder of the 1990s and into the 2000s, but turned her focus to writing. She has published five mystery novels since 2004. Her debut novel, Dating Dead Men, earned her an Agatha, Anthony, and Macavity Award.

Early life
Kozak was born Susan Jane Kozak in Wilkes-Barre, Pennsylvania, the daughter of Dorothy (née Taraldsen), a university music teacher, and Joseph Aloysius Kozak, an attorney. She has seven older siblings; their father died when she was a year old. Kozak was raised in Lincoln, Nebraska. 

Kozak attended the University of Nebraska–Lincoln for three semesters before relocating to New York City, where she worked as a waitress for ten years. During this period, she attended New York University's Graduate Acting Program at the Tisch School of the Arts, graduating in 1980. Of her name, Kozak has said that "Harley" came from a former boyfriend, who owned a Harley-Davidson motorcycle, and that she liked the nickname, later having her name legally changed.

Career
Kozak starred in movies such as The House on Sorority Row (1983), Parenthood (1989), Side Out (1990), Arachnophobia (1990), The Taking of Beverly Hills (1991), Necessary Roughness (1991), All I Want for Christmas (1991), The Favor (1994), Magic in the Water (1995), Unforgivable (1996), and the soap operas Texas (from November 1981 to December 1982 as Brette Wheeler), Guiding Light (from 1983 to 1985 and a one-day voice-over in February 1990, as both Annabelle Sims Reardon and Annabelle's deceased mother, in 1983 flashbacks, Annie Sims) and Santa Barbara (from 1985 to 1986 and again in 1989, as former nun, Mary Duvall McCormick).

In Santa Barbara, her character died in an accident where a giant neon letter "C" toppled onto her during an argument atop the Capwell hotel. Viewers were so angry over Mary's death that they started a letter-writing campaign demanding for her reappearance. The show received such a huge number of letters that eventually they admitted their mistake and asked Kozak to come back. She declined the offer since she was already working with other projects and she was proud of the unusual way her character had made her exit. In February 1989, though, she made a brief return as an angel in Heaven. In 1987 Harley received a Soap Opera Digest Award from her role as Mary.

In 1993–1994, Kozak played Alison Hart, wife of Dave Hart, portrayed by Beau Bridges, on the CBS comedy/western series Harts of the West. The program was set on a dude ranch in Nevada. Lloyd Bridges played the ranch foreman, and Diane Ladd appeared once as Alison's mother. Her three children were played by Sean Murray, Nathan Watt and Meghann Haldeman, who has been friends with her on-screen mother ever since. Mark Harmon also guest-starred the series. Kozak has worked several times with Harmon, both in movies and TV series and she credits him as one of her favorite co-stars.

In 1996, Kozak appeared in the mini-series Titanic along with Peter Gallagher and Catherine Zeta Jones. She played the role of Bess Allison, a mother who dies while searching for her missing baby at the time when RMS Titanic sinks. Kozak was originally chosen to play Karen Sammler in the TV show Once and Again. She filmed the pilot, but was asked to withdraw from the series when she became pregnant with her first child, because they did not want her character to be pregnant. The role went to Susanna Thompson. Also in 1996, Kozak portrayed a battered wife in a made for TV movie, Unforgivable, co-starring with John Ritter, and received praise for her "strong" performance. Kozak also appeared in "Cold Lazarus", a first-season episode of Stargate SG-1, as Sara O'Neill.

Kozak has written five novels: Dating Dead Men (2004), Dating Is Murder : A Novel (2005), Dead Ex (2007), and A Date You Can't Refuse (2008), all of which feature greeting-card designer and amateur sleuth Wollie Shelley, a woman with very eccentric friends and family. The first three novels were published by Doubleday, a division of Random House, and the most recent was published by Broadway Books following the restructuring of Doubleday. Dating Dead Men won an Agatha Award, an Anthony Award, and a Macavity Award for best first novel. Kozak's fifth book is Keeper of the Moon, a paranormal romantic suspense novel.

Personal life
Kozak lives in Los Angeles, California. She has been married twice: a brief union in the early 1980s and a second marriage from 1997 to 2007 with entertainment lawyer Gregory Aldisert, with whom she has three children.

Partial filmography

Bibliography

Wollie Shelley Mysteries

The Keepers, LA 
Books 0.5, 1, 3 and 4 by Heather Graham Pozzessere

Book 3 by Alexandra Sokoloff

Anthologies

References

External links
Official Site

1957 births
Agatha Award winners
Women mystery writers
American film actresses
American television actresses
Tisch School of the Arts alumni
People from the Scranton–Wilkes-Barre metropolitan area
American people of Slovak descent
Anthony Award winners
Macavity Award winners
Actresses from Nebraska
Actresses from Pennsylvania
Living people
20th-century American actresses
21st-century American actresses